Stojeszyn-Kolonia  is a village in the administrative district of Gmina Modliborzyce, within Janów Lubelski County, Lublin Voivodeship, in eastern Poland.

References

Stojeszyn-Kolonia